The 2011 Super League Grand Final was the 14th official Grand Final and the championship-deciding game of the Super League XVI season. It was held on Saturday, 8 October at Manchester, England's Old Trafford stadium. The match was contested by St. Helens and the Leeds Rhinos, who last faced each other in a grand final in 2009. British rock band Feeder were due to provide the pre-match music entertainment, only for their show to be called off due to the pitch being wet and Manchester United manager Alex Ferguson not allowing a stage to be built on the pitch. Leeds won the game by 32 points to 16.

Background
St Helens had finished the regular season in 3rd place with 37 points while Leeds had finished 5th with 31 points.

Route to the Final

St Helens

Leeds Rhinos

Match details

World Club Challenge

The World Club Challenge was set to take place between the winner of the Super League Grand Final, Leeds Rhinos and the winner of the NRL Grand Final, Manly-Warringah Sea Eagles on 17 February 2012, at Headingley Carnegie Stadium.

References

External links
Official Site

Super League Grand Finals
St Helens R.F.C. matches
Leeds Rhinos matches
Grand final
October 2011 sports events in the United Kingdom